Leddure Rashad Bauman (born May 7, 1979) is a former American football player in the National Football League who played cornerback. He attended the University of Oregon and was a third-team All-American selection by the NFL Draft Report, as well as an All-Pac-10 second-team choice. He was selected in the third round in the 79th overall pick of the 2002 NFL Draft. He played two seasons with the Washington Redskins before being traded to Cincinnati in 2004.  He recorded 50 tackles and 2 interceptions in a 43-game career.

References

1979 births
Living people
Sportspeople from Tempe, Arizona
American football cornerbacks
Oregon Ducks football players
Cincinnati Bengals players
Washington Redskins players
Ed Block Courage Award recipients